Siopis is a surname. Notable people with the surname include:

Dimitris Siopis (born 1995), Greek footballer, brother of Manolis
Manolis Siopis (born 1994), Greek footballer
Penny Siopis (born 1953), South African artist

Greek-language surnames